Harry or Harold Ashton may refer to:

Harry Ashton, a character on List of former Coronation Street characters
Harry Ashton, a character in Forgotten Faces
Harold Ashton, a character in A Hole in One

See also
Henry Ashton (disambiguation)